Hillcrest National STEM Secondary School (formerly known as Hillcrest National Technical Secondary School) is a Government High School running from Grade Eight (8) to Grade Twelve (12). 
The school is located in Livingstone, Zambia, and was established in 1956. It is one of the biggest schools in the country selecting students from all provinces in Zambia. The school offers both O Level and A Level education and is a co-curricular school.

Notable alumni
Chimwemwe Chihana-Mtawali, a singer-songwriter
Kan 2, a singer-songwriter
Nevers Mumba, Former Vice President of the Republic of Zambia.

References

Education in Livingstone, Zambia
Schools in Livingstone
Secondary schools in Zambia
Educational institutions established in 1956
1956 establishments in Northern Rhodesia